Kōtokuzan Tarō (born 11 March 1994 as Jasper Kenneth Arboladura Terai) is a Filipino-Japanese professional sumo wrestler from Makati, Philippines. Making his professional debut in September 2009, he reached the top makuuchi division for the first time in March 2022. He has a highest rank of maegashira 16. He wrestles for Arashio stable.

Career
He was born in Makati but grew up in Santa Rosa. He has two younger sisters. While his Filipino mother worked in Japan he was raised by his grandmother.  He was first introduced to sumo by seeing it on TV in the Philippines. At the age of 11, he moved to Japan, joining his mother and his stepfather (he never knew his biological father).  He had never learnt the Japanese language before entering school and struggled with reading kanji.  Fearing he would not make a good high school student, he took the advice of his stepfather and visited Arashio stable for two days to explore sumo as a possible alternative career path. He was accepted by the stable after graduating from junior high school. 

Beginning his career at just 15, he was considerably younger than most of his training partners at his stable. He weighed just 103 kg and was 177 cm tall when he made his professional debut in September 2009. After his first tournament he was given the shikona of Kōtokuzan ("Kōto" being a different reading of the "Ara" or 荒 kanji used at his stable and not related to the "Koto" commonly used at Sadogatake stable). He won no championships moving up through the professional sumo divisions and moved between the fourth-tier sandanme and third makushita divisions a number of times before finally establishing himself in makushita in 2017. By this time his weight had increased to 156 kg. He was forced to sit out the January 2021 tournament due to a COVID-19 outbreak at his stable, but in the following tournament a 4–3 record moved him up to Makushita 1. In May 2021 he earned promotion to the sekitori ranks with a 5–2 record. Although his jūryō division debut in July was unsuccessful, a 4–11 score dropping him back to makushita, he returned to jūryō in November and two consecutive winning records in double figures saw him promoted to the top makuuchi division for the March 2022 tournament. He followed his stablemate Wakamotoharu, who had made his top division debut in the previous tournament. Kōtokuzan represents Kanagawa Prefecture, and he is the tenth wrestler from that prefecture to reach makuuchi.

Fighting style
Kōtokuzan is an oshi-sumo specialist, who prefers pushing and thrusting at his opponents rather than fighting on the mawashi or belt. His most common winning kimarite are hataki komi (slap down) tsuki otoshi (thrust down) and oshi dashi (push out).

Career record

See also
Glossary of sumo terms
List of active sumo wrestlers

References

External links

1994 births
Living people
Japanese sumo wrestlers
Japanese people of Filipino descent